William Michael Evans is a former professional American football player who played offensive lineman for six seasons for the Philadelphia Eagles. He is a member of the Boston College Sports Hall of Fame. Philadelphia Eagles Offensive MVP – 1971. His wife is Kitty and they have three children: Patt, Kelly, Kate.

References

1946 births
Living people
American football centers
Boston College Eagles football players
Philadelphia Eagles players
Players of American football from Pennsylvania